Twinking is a type of behavior in role-playing games that is disapproved of by other players. A player who engages in such behavior is known as a twink. The precise definition of twinking varies depending on the variety of role-playing game:

In "pen and paper" role-playing games, a twink is often synonymous with a munchkin, i.e. a powergamer who seeks to acquire power and loot at the expense of their teammates. 
In MUDs – Multi-User Dungeons or Domains –a twink is a player who is variously anything from a munchkin to a newbie (new player) to a griefer, or a bad faith player.  
In massively multiplayer online role-playing games, or MMORPGs, twinking refers to a character gaining equipment with the assistance of a higher level character, particularly by giving the low-level character higher level equipment that is otherwise unattainable. It can also be used to describe the process of keeping a video game character at a low level while using in-game currency, earned by a high-level character, to provide it with superior equipment.

A related term, smurfing also exists. Often used in video gaming, smurfing describes a situation in which "a highly-skilled player creates a secondary account as a disguise to play against less proficient opponents." The term originates from two Warcraft II players employing the strategy under the names "Papa Smurf" and "Smurfette".

RPGs
In role-playing video games, particularly MMORPGs, twinking refers to outfitting a new character or player with items or other resources that are not normally available to new or low-level characters. A twink in this usage is a type of powergamer and munchkin. The term can also refer to the twinked character itself (e.g., "My twink has all the best gear."). In its most basic definition, a twink is a character with better gear than one could have easily acquired on one's own.

Twinking is typically done by transferring higher-end equipment from the player's (or their friend's) more experienced characters (who often have excess gear that would be much more useful to the lower-level character). It can also be done by equipping the character with the best possible gear for their level range, and filling them with end-game enchantments.

Many new players dislike twinking of others' characters, since it gives a big advantage to established players starting a new character. Some new players do not like to have their own characters twinked, as they prefer to earn the equipment for themselves.

It is common for twinking items to be traded at good values due to persistent demand. Sometimes, this will go so far as to inflate twink equipment prices, as high-level players are willing to pay more than a newbie would be able to.

Examples
Twinking can happen whenever players can interact and trade with each other, regardless of how present other players can be in the game itself; the handheld roleplaying game Pokémon, as an example, allows players to trade their Pokémon with each other.

Twinking was once very common in the CORPG Guild Wars, when players would have their low-level characters taken by high-level characters to end-game areas to obtain the best armor, weapons, and skills available (different terms are used to describe this action: being "carried through", "Pushed through", "boosted", "getting a boost"), as Guild Wars does not have a level limit on such things. These twinked characters would then return to low-level PvP areas to fight significantly disadvantaged opponents. This practice became so proliferate that the Guild Wars development team introduced a patch prohibiting characters with high-level armor entering beginner arenas.

World of Warcraft includes items that are specifically intended to make twinking more viable but less disruptive. These items belong to the "Heirloom" rarity class and have a number of unique characteristics. Their most unusual attribute is that they bind to a player's account rather than the character, allowing them to be handed down from higher-level characters to lower-level ones but prohibiting them from being transferred from veteran players to new players. Thus, the twinking player is still required to earn these items, even if the twinked character does not. The other distinguishing characteristics of Heirlooms are that they have no real level requirement and their properties scale with character level, making them usable by and useful to all characters equally regardless of level.

In addition to heirlooms, World of Warcraft also includes an option whereby a character may pay 10 gold to disable experience-gain and thereby maintain a specific level. This enables the twink to more easily farm for Honor Points (the in-game currency used to purchase weapons and armour for PvP combat) in player versus player battlegrounds by permanently remaining at the highest playable level for their battleground bracket (e.g. level 19 for the 15–19 battleground bracket, level 74 for the 70–74 battleground bracket, etc.). The character can also attempt to obtain the best possible item per equipment slot available to that specific level. The character may attempt this solo, in groups, or with the help from high-level characters. By competing at the highest level allowed in the battleground bracket, and equipped with the best possible gear, twinks played with a significant advantage over regular players. New players as well as low-level players in the battleground bracket were often at a severe disadvantage in games that fielded numerous twinks. Because of the gear and/or experience advantage, twinks often easily overpowered new and low-level players, quickly eliminating them from play. Consequently, these players experienced little of the actual gameplay. Battlegrounds often had twinks playing for both factions, Horde and Alliance, leveling the playing field to an extent, but winning and losing could be grossly influenced by which faction fielded fewer twinks. However, because of the large twink communities, especially at lower level brackets, battlegrounds were often filled with organized teams of twinks competing against each other.

Another example of twinking can be found in the MMORPG Anarchy Online, where twinking is performed by buffing base stats using items (stat buffing weapons, armour) and laddering implants (laddering is a method by which the character equips higher implants by climbing quality levels one by one as one does, a ladder). Once a high-stat buffing item is equipped, it stays equipped even if the stats required to initially equip it decline or wear off, though a penalty can be applied if the base stats fall too far below the equipping requirements. Twinking is an essential component to this game in both PvP and in soloing Instances within the game. Whereas twinking is seen in negative light in other MMORPGS, it is seen positively in Anarchy Online.

In other online RPGs, such as Dark Souls, twinking can be done through a few methods, including gaining the help of other players who are at a higher level in order to have them clear content before it should be accessible, memorizing the locations of particular powerful items, and utilizing very specific strategies to advance further in the storyline than should otherwise be possible. This has a more direct effect on game play, especially in any game which involves online player-versus-player (PvP) combat such as Dark Souls, as the result can be two players who appear to be evenly matched on the surface being vastly unbalanced in terms of items or weaponry available to them. While a game's developers may not consider these tactics to be outright exploitation of the underlying game engine, often these tactics are 'nerfed' in some way in order to discourage twinking, such as removing, repositioning, or reducing the effectiveness of certain items within the game to make the progression more linear between players.

Some games such as Borderlands 2 feature an in-game method of transferring items between characters on the same account. This is done in Borderlands through a storage container located in the game's central hub, allowing up to four items to be stored and retrieved by any of the player's characters.

Countermeasures
Many games have item restrictions that prevent low-level characters from using higher-level items and upsetting game balance; in Diablo II and The Lord of the Rings Online, most items require a minimum ability score or level to equip. This did not totally prevent the problem of higher-level characters handing down gold or very powerful gear; it just changed what could be used in this strategy.
Some games, such as World of Warcraft (WoW), Anarchy Online (AO), EverQuest (EQ), and The Lord of the Rings Online (LOTRO) have certain items become restricted to one character—"Soulbound" (WoW), "NoDrop" (AO), "No Trade" (EQ), or "Bound" (LOTRO) —when the items are picked up, equipped, or used. These items cannot thereafter be transferred to other characters (even one's own characters on the same realm/server, with some limited exceptions). Some items are bound to a specific account ("Bind To Account" in WoW, "Heirloom" in EQ, "Bound to account" in LOTRO) and cannot be transferred to other people's accounts, but can be traded between characters on the same account.
WoW further reduced twinking in Battlegrounds (player-versus-player combat arenas) by awarding experience points for Battleground victories, so that as PvP characters gain experience, they also gain levels and thus become disqualified from lower-level brackets. Additionally, some of the best-in-slot items became "heirlooms" that apply a percentage increase to all experience point gains. Players can disable experience point gain for an in-game fee, but must play in separate Battlegrounds as long as they do so (commonly referred to as "no-EXP," "xp-off," or "twink-only" Battlegrounds) where most of the other players will also be twinkers. Queue times in many brackets now show "unavailable" due to not enough people queueing up in the respective level brackets. As of February 9, 2012, WoW brackets 15–19, 20–24, and 70–74 are the only full-time active brackets with 70–74 being the largest Level brackets were also split in half, so there are separate levels 10–14 and 15–19 brackets instead of a single 10-19 bracket (and so on through the higher brackets). Thus, players only compete against other players who are closer in level to themselves.
WoW eliminated twinking in PvP combat arenas in patch 7.0.3, by removing all stats gained from equipment upon entry and instead giving the character predetermined PvP stats based on its class and specialization.
Pokémon games use a badge system, which makes Pokémon above a certain level tougher to control, making random actions and falling asleep instead of obeying commands until the trainer has completed enough of the campaign.

Online role-playing games
In online role-playing games, twinking may include, but is not limited to
Denial-of-service or "DoS" attacks
Hacking the server
Creating an invincible or extremely powerful character with which the twink will seek to dominate in role-play
Aggravating and attacking the game administration or game community
Exploit
Cheating
Powergaming
Metagaming, being able to guess or preempt plot points based on prior knowledge from having previously played the game in question.

Etymology

There are several possible etymologies for the word. It may not have been derived from a single source, instead evolving from multiple convergent usages. Its exact origin is unclear.

The gay-slang usage of "twink" has been suggested as a likely origin. One of the connotations of this usage is "a young/inexperienced person who can outfit himself fashionably because of financial benefits from an older/experienced sugar daddy." This parallels MMORPGs, where in-game money is a strong limiting factor in the virtual economy and gear is usually in the form of clothing and jewelry.

The word "twink" appeared in the Ultima Online: Renaissance playguide in the glossary of terms (copyrighted in 2000). It was asserted to have a meaning similar to its current one, but also included powerlevelling.

On the MUD Sojourn, which several creators of EverQuest played, "twink" was alternately used to refer to powerleveling and metagaming. As MUDs date to 1978, this use of the term may possibly predate later uses.

The term twink and twinking predated MMOs and was prevalent in many MUDs. The term came from flags on much of the high-end gear that cause gear to be displayed as (twinkling) <gear name>. It was not an alternate name for powerleveling, but could be used as a method of powerleveling.

See also
 Munchkin (role-playing games)
 Optimization (role-playing games)
 Powerleveling
 Cheating
 Powergaming
 Min-maxing
 Role-playing game terms

References

Esports terminology
MUD terminology
Cheating in video games
Video game gameplay
Video game terminology